Francisco Vázquez (born 19 September 1952) is a Mexican former cyclist. He competed in the individual road race and team time trial events at the 1972 Summer Olympics.

References

External links
 

1952 births
Living people
Mexican male cyclists
Olympic cyclists of Mexico
Cyclists at the 1972 Summer Olympics
Place of birth missing (living people)
Pan American Games medalists in cycling
21st-century Mexican people
20th-century Mexican people
Pan American Games bronze medalists for Mexico
Medalists at the 1975 Pan American Games